Monster in a Box is a monologue originally performed live on stage by the writer Spalding Gray then subsequently made into a 1992 film starring Gray and directed by Nick Broomfield.

A follow-up to Gray's earlier work, Swimming to Cambodia, the work consists of a long-form monologue by Gray detailing the trials and tribulations he encountered while writing his first novel, Impossible Vacation (the titular "monster"). He also relates the sudden fame afforded him after the release of Swimming to Cambodia.

The soundtrack for the film was composed by Laurie Anderson.

An extended version of the monologue was published in book form prior to the release of the film.

Parody
This monologue – or at least its title – was parodied on Sesame Street in an installment of "Monsterpiece Theater." The main actor (and writer) for the parody was a monster aptly called Spalding Monster in homage to Gray.

References

External links

1992 films
Concert films
Films directed by Nick Broomfield
1992 drama films
One-character films
Films scored by Laurie Anderson
1990s English-language films